The 1973 New Zealand Grand Prix was a race held at the Pukekohe Park Raceway on 6 January 1973.  The race had 20 starters.

It was the 19th New Zealand Grand Prix, and doubled as the first round of the 1973 Tasman Series.  Australian John McCormack won his first NZGP in his Elfin MR5 who finished ahead of Britons Allan Rollinson and Steve Thompson. The first New Zealand driver to finish was Graham McRae in the McRae GM1 who came in 4th place.

After the fatal accident of Bryan Faloon the previous year, two chicanes were added to circuit in a bid to slow the cars down. One was placed down the back straight and the other was just before the main straight. These chicanes were very artificial, with them being made up of concrete kerbing, railway sleepers and tractor tyres.

Classification

References

Grand Prix
New Zealand Grand Prix
Tasman Series
January 1973 sports events in New Zealand